Wang Xiubin (born March 1964) is a general (Shangjiang) of the People's Liberation Army (PLA). He has been commander of the Southern Theater Command since June 2021. He is an alternate member of the 19th Central Committee of the Chinese Communist Party.

Biography
Wang was born in Rudong County, Jiangsu, in March 1964. He enlisted in the People's Liberation Army in January 1983. He served in the 1st Group Army for a long time. He was deputy commander of the 31st Group Army in 2013 and the 1st Group Army in 2015. In 2015, he attended the 2015 China Victory Day Parade, a military parade held in Beijing to celebrate the 70th anniversary of Victory over Japan Day of World War II. In July 2016 he was promoted to become commander of the 1st Group Army, a position he held until 2017. In March 2017, he was made commander of the 80th Group Army. In April 2019, he became deputy commander of the Eastern Theater Command, concurrently holding the chief of staff position. He rose to become commander of the Southern Theater Command in June 2021.

He was promoted to the rank of major general (Shaojiang) in July 2014, lieutenant general (Zhongjiang) in December 2019, and general (Shangjiang) in July 2021.

References

1964 births
Living people
People from Rudong County
People's Liberation Army generals from Jiangsu
Alternate members of the 19th Central Committee of the Chinese Communist Party